Melodia may refer to:

Music
Luiz Melodia (1951–2017), a Brazilian singer and songwriter
 Melodía, an album by Spanish singer Melody (2004)
Melodia (album), an album by the Vines (2008)
Melodia (label), a Soviet music label
"Melodia", an Italian song, adapted into English as "The Way It Used to Be" (Engelbert Humperdinck song)
Melodia Women's Choir of New York City, a choral organization

Other uses
 Melodia (personification), the personification of Melody in medieval Byzantine iconography
 Melodia, a fictional music-based villain from the animated television series SilverHawks
 Cadena Melodía,  a Colombian radio network
 Melodía FM Estéreo, a radio station in Bogotá, Colombia, part of the Cadena Melodía network

See also
 
 Melodica, a musical instrument
 Melospiza melodia, or song sparrow
 Melody (disambiguation)